Eunebristis is a genus of moth in the family Gelechiidae.

Species
Eunebristis cinclidias (Meyrick, 1918)
Eunebristis gyralea (Meyrick, 1922)
Eunebristis oncotera (Walsingham, 1911)
Eunebristis zachroa (Meyrick, 1914)
Eunebristis zingarella (Walsingham, 1897)

References

Further reading
 

Dichomeridinae